Emily Atef (born 6 May 1973) is a German-French-Iranian director, screenwriter and producer based in Berlin.

Early life
At the age of 7, Atef moved from Berlin to Los Angeles with her French-Iranian parents and her brother the drummer Cyril Atef. She was 13 when they moved to France, where Atef finished school, and later she went to London to work as an actor in the London theater scene. Atef returned to Berlin to study film direction at the prestigious Deutsche Film und Fernsehakademie Berlin.

Career
Her first feature-length film Molly's Way which, like her 2 following feature films was co-authored by Esther Bernstorff received an advancement award at the Filmfest München (film festival Munich) in 2005 for best script and the Grand Jury Award  at the Mar del Plata Film Festival, the only A-Festival in South America as well as several other awards. Her second feature-length film The Stranger in Me which deals with a young mother having postnatal depression also received several awards and was screened at the International Critics' Week of the Cannes Film Festival. She then got a scholarship from the Cinéfondation in Cannes, which she used, to write her next movie Kill me that is distributed by Les Films du Losange Kill Me was voted as best fictional foreign language work at the 2013 Bradford Film Festival. Atef directed her first TV film Königin der Nacht (Queen of the night) a family drama shot in the Black Forest for the ARD in 2016. In the same year Atef directed Wunschkinder a true story about a couples extreme endeavour to adopt a child in Russia.  Written by the Grimme prize winner Dorothee Schön and produced by X Filme Creative Pool. Atef shot the film in Poland and Berlin. In 2017 Atef directed a TV Drama, Macht euch keine Sorgen (Don't worry, I'm fine) for the ARD produced by ZeroOne Film, about a father who finds out his 19-year-old son has left to Syria to be part of ISIS. The film opened at the 51's Hof International Filmfestival in the Autumn of 2017 and will air on German TV in 2018.

In 2017, Emily Atef wrote and directed the feature film 3 Days in Quiberon It depicts 3 emotional days of one of Europe's biggest stars,  Romy Schneider  where she gave her last German interview to ‘Stern’ magazine.  
3 Days in Quiberon had its world premiere in the competition section of the 68. Berlin International Film Festival and competed for the Golden Bear. 3 Days in Quiberon was the big winner at the German Academy Awards in 2018 taking home seven Lolas: The Golden Lola for best film as well as statuettes for best director for Atef, lead actress Marie Bäumer, supporting actors Birgit Minichmayr and Robert Gwisdek, DoP Thomas W. Kiennast, and composers Christoph M. Kaiser and Julian Maas.

In 2022 her film More Than Ever, starring Vicky Krieps and Gaspard Ulliel, was shown in the section Un certain regard at the 75th Cannes Film Festival.

Filmography

Director

Actress

Awards
An advancement award for Molly's Way
German Independence Awards for The Stranger in Me
Otto Sprenger Award for The Stranger in Me

References

External links
 
 

Mass media people from Berlin
German film actresses
1973 births
Living people
Actresses from Berlin
German people of French descent
German people of Iranian descent
21st-century German actresses